is the twenty-first single by Japanese artist Masaharu Fukuyama. It was released on 24 May 2006.

Track listing

Limited Edition CD
Milk Tea
Utsukushiki Hana
Love Train
Ano Natsu Mo Umi Mo Sora Mo
Milk Tea (Original Karaoke)
Utsukushiki Hana (Original Karaoke)
Love Train (Original Karaoke)
Ano Natsu Mo Umi Mo Sora Mo (Original Karaoke)

Limited Edition DVD
Milk Tea (Special Clip)
Utsukushiki Hana (Special Clip)

Normal Edition CD
Milk Tea
Utsukushiki Hana
Love Train
Ano Natsu Mo Umi Mo Sora Mo
Milk Tea (Original Karaoke)
Utsukushiki Hana (Original Karaoke)
Love Train (Original Karaoke)
Ano Natsu Mo Umi Mo Sora Mo (Original Karaoke)

Oricon sales chart (Japan)

References

2006 singles
Masaharu Fukuyama songs
Oricon Weekly number-one singles